Allenton may refer to:

Places
Allenton, Derbyshire, England
Allenton, New Zealand, a suburb in the town of Ashburton, New Zealand
Allenton, Northumberland, England is now called Alwinton
Allenton, Michigan, USA
Allenton, Wisconsin, USA

See also
Allanton (disambiguation)
Allentown (disambiguation)